The term English Travellers refers to itinerant groups, and may mean:

 Romanichals, a Romani ethnic group also known as English Travellers or English Gypsies
 British showmen, commonly referred to as Funfair Travellers
 New Age travellers

See also
 Scottish Romani and Itinerant people groups
 Irish Travellers 
 Traveler (disambiguation)